Sir Walter John Worboys (22 February 1900 – 17 March 1969), was an Australian-born British businessman and chemist. He is best known for widely reforming road traffic signage in the United Kingdom.

Biography

He was born in Perth, Western Australia, and educated at Scotch College and the University of Western Australia. Elected a Rhodes Scholar in 1922, he gained his D.Phil. after a further period of study at Lincoln College, Oxford. His first job was as a research chemist at Brunner Mond & Co. From there he moved to ICI, eventually reaching the rank of director.

In 1947 he joined the Council of Industrial Design, a body set up by the Board of Trade in 1944. He was chairman of the council from 1953 until 1960, during which time he set up the Design Centre, a permanent exhibition of the council’s work. The establishment of the Design Centre proved to be a turning point in the history of the council, which until that time had attracted more critics than friends.

In 1961 he was appointed to chair a committee to bring in a new era of modern road signage. The committee reported in 1963, advocating a total overhaul of the style of British road signs, introducing a new style that has lasted until the present day. The report recommended the pictorial design found on many European road signs, along with a British-designed font that was to become known as the Transport font.

Worboys died on 17 March 1969.

Notes

1900 births
1969 deaths
Alumni of Lincoln College, Oxford
Imperial Chemical Industries executives
Knights Bachelor
People associated with the University of East Anglia
People educated at Scotch College, Perth
People from Perth, Western Australia
University of Western Australia alumni
Australian emigrants to the United Kingdom